Ann-Mari, Princess of Bismarck (née Tengbom; 26 July 1907 – 22 September 1999) was a Swedish socialite and the wife of Otto Christian Archibald, Prince of Bismarck.

Biography 
Ann-Mari was born on 26 July 1907 in Stockholm. She was the daughter of Swedish architect Ivar Tengbom. She attended school in Stockholm, where she was a classmate of Folke Bernadotte, Count of Wisborg.

On 18 April 1928 she married German politician and diplomat Otto Christian Archibald, Prince of Bismarck in a Lutheran ceremony at the Berlin Cathedral. They had six children:
 Countess Mari Ann (1929–1981).
 Ferdinand, Prince of Bismarck (1930–2019)
 Count Carl Alexander (1935–1992).
 Count Maximilian Viktor (born 1947).
 Countess Gunilla Margaretha (born 1949)
 Count Eduard Leopold (born 1951).

She and her husband moved into a villa in Rome, where she was known to have thrown parties for members of Italian and German high society. While her husband was a diplomat in Rome, the Princess told Gian Galeazzo Ciano, 2nd Count of Cortellazzo and Buccari's head of Cabinet, Filippo Anfuso "that Germany is lost, that Hitler has ruined the country and its people". 

She died on 22 September 1999 in Marbella, Spain.

References 

1907 births
1999 deaths
Bismarck family
German princesses
Nobility in the Nazi Party
Princesses by marriage
People from Stockholm
Swedish Nazis
Swedish socialites
Tengbom family